Oleksiy Ivanovych Remeniuk (12 January 1956 – 9 November 2022) was a Ukrainian politician. A member of Hromada and later Batkivshchyna, he served in the Verkhovna Rada from 1998 to 2006.

Remeniuk died in a traffic collision in Simferopol, on 9 November 2022, at the age of 66.

References

1956 births
2022 deaths
Hromada (political party) politicians
All-Ukrainian Union "Fatherland" politicians
Third convocation members of the Verkhovna Rada
Fourth convocation members of the Verkhovna Rada
People from Zhytomyr Oblast